Brown v Burdett (1882) 21 Ch D 667 is an English trusts law case, concerning the ability to create a trust for a purpose that does not benefit any actual person.

Facts
An old lady, Anna Maria Burdett who lived in Gilmorton, Leicestershire demanded in her will that her house be boarded up with "good long nails to be bent down on the inside", but for some reason with her clock remaining inside, for twenty years. She directed her trustees to visit the house every three months to see that the trusts were effectually carried out, and if any trustee neglected this they should lose their entitlements under the will.

Judgment
Bacon VC cancelled the trust altogether, and held that the twenty-year term was invalid for the house, yard, garden, and outbuildings. He said very briefly,

See also

English trust law

Notes

References

English trusts case law
Court of Appeal (England and Wales) cases
1882 in British law
1882 in case law